Jane Jin Kaisen (born May 28, 1980) is a visual artist and filmmaker based in Copenhagen, Denmark.

Biography
Kaisen was born in Jeju Island, South Korea and adopted to Denmark in 1980. She is Professor of Media Arts at The Royal Danish Academy of Fine Arts. She received her Ph.D. from University of Copenhagen, her MA in Media Art and Art Theory from The Royal Danish Academy of Fine Arts and an MFA in Interdisciplinary Studio Art from The University of California Los Angeles. She also participated in The Whitney Independent Study Program.

Working with video installation, experimental film, photographic installation, performance, and text, Kaisen's artistic practice is informed by extensive interdisciplinary research and engagement with diverse communities. She is known for her visually striking, multilayered, performative, poetic, and multi-voiced feminist works through which past and present are brought into relation. Engaging topics such as memory, migration, borders, and translation, she activates the field where subjective experience and embodied knowledge intersect with larger political histories. Her works negotiate and mediate the means of representation, resistance and reconciliation, thus forming alternative genealogies and sites of collective emergence.

She represented Korea at the 58th Venice Biennale with the film installation Community of Parting (2019) alongside artists Hwayeon Nam and siren eun young jeong in the exhibition History Has Failed Us, but No Matter curated by Hyunjin Kim.

Her narrative experimental film The Woman, The Orphan, and The Tiger (2010) made in collaboration with Guston Sondin-Kung explores the gendered effects of war and militarism by tracing a genealogy between three generations of women.

In 2011 Jane Jin Kaisen began the multi-channel video installation Reiterations of Dissent for which she was awarded the Montana ENTERPRIZE. The piece has been exhibited widely and in multiple formats, among others at Asia Culture Center (KR), Leeum, Samsung Museum of Art (KR), Aarhus Kunstbygning (DK), Kunsthallen Brandts (DK),  Sonoma County Museum (USA), and The Jeju April 3 Peace Park (KR).

Jane Jin Kaisen is the co-founder of the artist unit itinerant with Guston Sondin Kung and together they have organized and curated a series of art exhibitions and events. She is also co-founder of the artist groups UFOlab (Unidentified Foreign Object Laboratory) with Anna Jin Hwa Borstam, Charlotte Kim Boed, Jette Hye Jin Mortensen and Trine Meesook Gleerup) as well as the artist group Orientity along with Natsue Haji OH, Kimura byol-nathalie lemoine, Adel KsK, Raymond Hahn, Naomi K. Long. The artist group Orientity has exhibited together in Kyoto Art Center (2004), in Hong Kong at Fringe Club (2005), in Montreal at Galerie La Centrale (2007), in Grenoble at la Maison Internationale (2008), in Lille at Maison Folies (2009) and at Art Space C, Jeju Korea (2021).

Jane Jin Kaisen has also curated exhibitions and events. She was a curator of the 10th Open International Performance Art Festival in 2009 in Beijing, China, which included performance artists from many different countries.

Selected solo exhibitions 
2021

Community of Parting, Art Sonje Center, Korea

Parallax Conjunctures, Museum of Contemporary Art Detroit, Detroit, United States

2020

Of Specters or Returns, Gallery damdam, Korean Cultural Center, Germany

Community of Parting, Kunsthal Charlottenborg, Copenhagen, Denmark

2019

The Woman, The Orphan, and The Tiger, Seoul International New Media Festival, Korea

Of Specters – or Returns, Inter Arts Center, Sweden

2015

Of Specters – or Returns, Astrid Noack's Atelier, Copenhagen, Denmark

Sites of Translation, Yonsei University, Underwood International College, Korea

Loving Belinda, Galleri Image, Aarhus, Denmark

2013

Jane Jin Kaisen – Reiterations of Dissent, Jeju April 3 Peace Park, Korea

Jane Jin Kaisen – Solo Exhibition, Art Space C, Korea

Revolution is not a Bird's Ete View..., Officin, Copenhagen, Denmark

2012

Dissident Translations, Kunsthal Aarhus, Aarhus, Denmark

2011

The Woman, The Orphan, and the Tiger w. Guston Sondin-Kung, Vox Populi Gallery, USA

Selected group exhibitions and film screenings 
2021

After Hope – Voices of Resistance, The Asian Art Museum of San Francisco, United States

2020

Pan Austro-Nesian, Kaohsiung Museum of Fine Art, Taiwan

Frequencies of Tradition, Times Art Museum, China

Negotiating Borders, Foundation Fiminco, France

Community of Parting, DMZ International Documentary Film Festival, Korea

Community of Parting, 8th Diaspora Film Festival, Korea

Our World is Burning, Palais de Tokyo, France

Born, A Woman, Suwon Museum of Art, Korea

Time Share, Performa Radical Broadcast, United States

History Has Failed Us, but No Matter, Arko Art Center, Korea

Screening of Community of Parting co-presented with GYOPO, Museum of Contemporary Art Los Angeles, United States

Precarious Life – Silence, Memory and Fictions, Onsugonggan, South Korea

2019

History Has Failed Us, But No Matter, 58th Venice Biennale Korean Pavilion, Italy

Neither black/red/yellow nor woman, Times Art Center Berlin, Germany

Screening of Tale of One or Many Mountains, DMZ International Documentary Film Festival, Korea

Zero Gravity World, SeMA Nam Seoul Museum of Art, South Korea

2018

Counter Memory & Reconstruction of Body Movement, Seoul International NewMedia Festival, Seoul Art Cinema, South Korea

10th DMZ International Documentary Film Festival, South Korea

Decolonizing Appearance, CAMP / Center for Art on Migration Politics, Copenhagen, Denmark

Film screening as part of Haegue Yang's exhibition Voices of Dispersion, Museum Ludwig, Cologne, Germany

Jeju 4.3 is Now Our History, National Museum of Contemporary Korean History, South Korea

Post Trauma: The Special Exhibition of the 70th Anniversary of the Jeju Massacre, Jeju Museum of Art, South Korea

Forged from the Collective Memory, ArtSpace C / Artspace IAa Gallery, South Korea

Forum Expanded: A Mechanism Capable of Changing itself, 68th Berlin International Film Festival

2017

Border 155, Seoul Museum of Art, South Korea

Today's Yesterday, 1st Anren Biennale, China, Today's Yesterday

Does Europe Exist? V2.0, ARTos Foundation, Cyprus

Tiempos Migratorios, Biennial ASAB, Columbia

The Promise and Compromise of Translation, Four Boxes Gallery, Denmark

Tourism, Jeju Biennale, Jeju Museum of Art, South Korea

Asian Diva: The Muse and the Monster, Seoul Museum of Art, South Korea

Soil and Stones, Souls and Songs, Art Center at the Jim Thompson House, Thailand

2 or 3 Tigers, Haus der Kulturen der Welt, Germany

2nd Changjiang International Photography and Video Biennale, China

Nordic Delights, Finnish Museum of Photography, Finland

The Time Share Project – The Real DMZ Project: The Aarhus Edition, Kunsthal Aarhus, Denmark

Soil and Stones, Souls and Songs, ParaSite, Hong Kong

Melancholia: Archipelago Journal screening of The Woman, The Orphan, and The Tiger, Enclave, United Kingdom

Rough Trade, 68 Art Institute, Copenhagen, Denmark

Nordic Delights, Fotografisk Center, Copenhagen, Denmark

Film screenings: The Woman, The Orphan, and the Tiger & Reiterations of Dissent, New York University, United States

Film screenings: The Woman, The Orphan, and The Tiger & Reiterations of Dissent, University of California San Diego, United States

House of Memories, Glasmoog, Raum Für Kunst & Diskurs, Cologne, Germany

Korea Film Archive, Feminism Video Artivist Biennale 2016, South Korea

Crossing the Line: Contemporary Art From Denmark, Critical Distance Center for Curators, Canada

Soil and Stones, Souls and Songs, Museum of Contemporary Art and Design, Philippines

Vulnerability Matters Laboratory, Rauma Biennale Balticum, Finland

For More Than One Voice: performative reading with Stina Hasse, Den Frie Udstillingsbygning, Copenhagen, Denmark

ArtSpectrum, Leeum Samsung Museum of Art, South Korea

Nordic Delights, Oslo Kunstforening, Oslo, Norway

The Woman, The Orphan, and The Tiger, New York University, Department of East Asian Studies, USA

2015

The Woman, The Orphan, and The Tiger, Husets Biograf, Copenhagen, Denmark

A Feminist Culture Reader, Danske Grafikeres Hus, Denmark

Interrupted Survey: Fractured Modern Mythologies, Asian Culture Center, South Korea,

Glocal Panorama, Seoul International NewMedia Festival, South Korea

Los Archivos del Cuerpo, Emerson College Huret & Spector Gallery, United States

Reiterations of Dissent, Raindance Film Centre, London, United Kingdom

Reiterations of Dissent, AAS Film Expo, Chicago, United States

Rencontres Internationales video archive, Haus der Kulturen der Welt, Germany

Arkiv over Hvidme, The National Gallery of Denmark – The Royal Cast Collection, Denmark

2014

Reiterations of Dissent selected as opening film, Seoul International NewMedia Festival, South Korea

Exclusion + Possibility, Gallery Zandari, South Korea

Camelia Has Fallen: Contemporary Korean Artists Reflect on the Jeju Uprising, Sonoma County Museum of Art, United States

2013

Women Commentators, Center for contemporary Art Ujazdowski Castle, Poland

Tell Me Her Story, Coreana Museum, South Korea

The Beginning is Always Today: Contemporary Feminist Art in Scandinavia, Sørlandet Art Museum, Norway

War Baby/Love Child, Wing Luke Museum of the Asian Pacific American Experience & DePaul Art Museum, United States

Visualising Affect, Lewisham Arthouse, United Kingdom

Strom Festival, Kunsthaus Rheania, Germany

The Nordic Model, Malmo Art Museum, Malmö, Sweden

Dear Curator, Curate Me, Selasar Sunaryo Art Space, Indonesia

War Baby / Love Child, DePaul Art Museum, Chicago, United States

Korean American Film Festival New York, Sylvia Wald and Po Kim Art Gallery, New York, United States

2012

7 Generous Gestures, Galleri Lars Olsen, Denmark

Women In-Between: Asian Women Artists 1984–2012, Fukuoka Asian Art Museum, Japan

ENTER II, Kunsthallen Brandts, Denmark, ENTER II

Videonale13 Festival for Contemporary Art, Kunstmuseum Bonn, Germany

FOKUS Video Art Festival, Nikolaj Kunsthal, Copenhagen, Denmark

IN THE ACT, Malmö Konsthall, Sweden, IN THE ACT

ACTS, Roskilde Museum for Contemporary Art, Denmark

3 films by Jane Jin Kaisen, Øst For Paradis Cinema, Aarhus, Denmark

Videonale13 Festival for Contemporary Art, Ars Cameralis, Poland

Videonale13 Festival for Contemporary Art, Gallery of Modern Art Glasgow, Scotland

Videonale13 Festival for Contemporary Art, Künstlerhaus Dortmund, Germany

Korean American Film Festival New York, United States

Jeju International Women's Film Festival, South Korea

Island of Stone shown as closing film, Seoul Human Rights Film Festival, South Korea

2010

Crossing the Sea, Jeju National Museum, South Korea

MFA2010, The Wight Gallery, UCLA, United States

Infr’acton Festival International d’art Performance, Sete, France

Yamagata International Documentary Film Festival, Japan

Taiwan International Documentary Film Festival, Taiwan

The Dialogic Imagination, IASPIS, Sweden

2009

2nd Incheon Women Artists Biennale, South Korea

EXIT09, Kunstforeningen Gl. Strand, Copenhagen, Denmark

Boarding Bridges, Kring Gallery, South Korea

Migrations, Municipal Art Gallery of Kalamata, Greece

Borders, Amelie A. Wallace Gallery, New York, United States

2nd Asian Women's Film Festival Berlin, Germany

25th International Asia Pacific Film Festival Los Angeles, United States

Yamagata International Documentary Film Festival, Japan

2008

Breaking Out, Gana Art Gallery New York, United States

The last Book Project, Buenos Aires National Library, Argentina

2nd Deformes Biennial, Gallery Metropolitana, Santiago, Chile

Unnamable Name, Tompkin's County Public Library, New York, United States

Privilege Walk, Lilith Performance Studio, Sweden

This is not a Koreanobela: a film trilogy, The Green Papaya Gallery, Philippines

2007

Traces in Photography, The National Museum of Photography, Denmark

Orientity Exhibition, Gallery La Centrale, Montreal, Canada

Exquisite Crisis and Encounters, New York University, United States

Visions from the Periphery, Kyunghee University Art Museum, South Korea

2006

South Korea as part of UFOlab: UFOlab Banana Power, 6th Gwangju Biennale, South Korea

Rethinking Nordic Colonialism, The Faroe Islands National Art Museum

Alternative Art Fair, Gallery Pixel, Denmark

Global Alien Television, Ssamzie Space, South Korea

International Indonesia Performance Art Event, National Gallery, Indonesia

4th DaDao Live Art Festival, 798 Art Zone, Beijing, China

International Film and Video Festival, Hong Kong Arts Center, Hong Kong

Malmo International Film Festival, Sweden

2005

Accent, Museum for Contemporary Art Roskilde, Denmark

Skin Deep, Echo Park Film Center, United States

Bandits-Mages International Media Festival, Bourges, France

2004

AREUM Vessel, Kyoto Museum of Art, Japan

Orientity Exhibition, Kyoto Arts Center, Japan

Our adoptee, Our Alien, Keumsan Gallery & Dongsanbang Gallery, South Korea

Minority Report, Aarhus Kunstbygning, Denmark

Awards
In 2008, she received the AHL Foundation Visual Arts award at Gana Art NY.

In 2011, she received the award Montana Enterprize at Kunsthallen Brandts.

In 2014, she was the recipient of the Mads Øvlisen PhD scholarship from the Novo Nordisk Foundation.

In 2021, Jane Jin Kaisen's exhibition Community of Parting at Kunsthal Charlottenborg was awarded "Exhibition of the Year 2020" by AICA - International Association of Art Critics, Denmark.

References

External links
Jane Jin Kaisen Official web site 
The Royal Danish Academy of Fine Arts, School of Media Arts 
Jane Jin Kaisen's staff page at Department of Arts and Cultural Studies, University of Copenhagen
Vimeo Channel of Jane Jin Kaisen

1980 births
Living people
21st-century Danish women artists
Danish adoptees
Danish people of Korean descent
South Korean adoptees
Royal Danish Academy of Fine Arts alumni
University of California, Los Angeles alumni